Shackley is a surname. Notable people with the surname include:

Myra Shackley (born 1949), Professor at Nottingham Business School and ordained priest in the Church of England
Theodore Shackley (1927–2002), CIA Officer